This article is about music-related events in 1840.

Events 
February 11 – Gaetano Donizetti's opera La Fille du Regiment premieres in Paris.
April 2 – Première of Ferdinand Hiller's oratorio, Die Zerstörung Jerusalems, at the Leipzig Gewandhaus; Robert Schumann is in the audience.
June 9 – Franz Liszt gives the first piano recital, in London's Hanover Square Rooms.
c. June - Felix Mendelssohn releases his score for String Quartet No. 3 in D Major.
August 6 – First major public performance since the death of Johann Sebastian Bach of the Toccata and Fugue in D minor, BWV 565 for organ attributed to him, given by Felix Mendelssohn in Leipzig; Robert Schumann is in the audience.
c. October – Richard Wagner is committed to debtors' prison in France while completing his opera Rienzi.
Robert Schumann's "year of song", in which he writes the two  Liederkreis, Frauenliebe und -leben and Dichterliebe.  He also marries Clara Wieck.
The first harmonium is built.
Anton Schindler's biography of Ludwig van Beethoven is published.
Michele Carafa becomes Professor of Counterpoint at the Paris Conservatoire.
Édouard Batiste and François Bazin share the Prix de Rome.

Popular music 
Henry Russell (music) & Eliza Cook (lyrics) – "The Old Arm Chair"
Robert Lucas de Pearsall – "Lay a garland"

Classical music 
Hector Berlioz - Grande symphonie funebre et triomphale 26 July
Felix Mendelssohn – Lobgesang (Symphony No. 2 in B-flat Major)
Robert Schumann
Liederkreis, Op. 24
Myrthen, Op. 25
Lieder und Gesänge volume, Op. 27
3 Gedichte, Op. 29
3 Gedichte, Op. 30
3 Gesänge, Op. 31
6 Lieder, Op. 33
4 Duets, Op. 34
12 Gedichte, Op. 35
6 Gedichte, Op. 36
Liederkreis, Op. 39
5 Lieder, Op. 40
Frauenliebe und -leben, Op. 42
3 Duets, Op. 43
Romanzen & Balladen volume I, Op. 45
Dichterliebe, Op. 48
Romanzen & Balladen volume II, Op. 49
Romanzen & Balladen volume III, Op. 53
Belsatzar, ballad, Op. 57

Louis Spohr – Symphony no 6 in G major, Op. 116 "Historical"

Opera 
Gaetano Donizetti – "La Favorite" and La Fille du Régiment (The Daughter of the Regiment)
Albert Lortzing – Hans Sachs
Temistocle Solera – Ildegonda
Giuseppe Verdi – Un giorno di regno

Births 
January 18 – Ernst Rudorff, composer and music teacher (d. 1918)
February 2 – Louis-Albert Bourgault-Ducoudray, pianist and composer (d. 1910)
February 12 – Philippe Decker, conductor and composer (d. 1881)
February 24 – Auguste Götze, German classical singer and vocal pedagogue (d. 1908)
March 8 – Franco Faccio, conductor and composer (d. 1891)
April 12 – Franz Xaver Haberl, musicologist (d. 1910)
May 7 –  Pyotr Ilyich Tchaikovsky, composer (d. 1893)
May 9 – Blanche d'Antigny, singer and actress (d. 1874)
August 1 – Franz Simandl, double-bassist and teacher (d. 1912)
August 28 – Ira D. Sankey, gospel singer and composer (d. 1908)
September 14 – George Whiting, composer (d. 1923)
September 30 – Johan Svendsen, violinist, conductor and composer (d. 1911)
October 18 – Roberto Stagno, operatic tenor (d. 1897)
December 7 – Hermann Goetz, composer (d. 1876)
December 17 – C. F. E. Horneman, composer (d. 1906)

Deaths 
March 20 – Anton Friedrich Justus Thibaut, lawyer and musician, 68
May 1 – Giuditta Grisi, operatic mezzo-soprano, 34
May 10 – Catterino Cavos, organist, conductor and composer, 64
May 25 – Nikolai Lavrov, operatic baritone, 37
May 27 – Niccolò Paganini, violinist and composer, 57
June 5 – William Dance, pianist and violinist, 84
June 16 – Joseph Kreutzer, violinist, conductor and composer, 49
November 19 – Johann Michael Vogl, baritone and composer, 72

References

 
19th century in music
Music by year